The 2011 Aegon GB Pro-Series Bath was a professional tennis tournament played on hard courts. It was the first edition of the tournament which was part of the 2011 ATP Challenger Tour and the 2011 ITF Women's Circuit. It took place in Bath, Great Britain between 21 and 27 March 2011.

ATP singles main-draw entrants

Seeds

Other entrants
The following players received wildcards into the singles main draw:
  Daniel Cox
  Daniel Evans
  Joshua Milton
  Daniel Smethurst

The following players received entry from the qualifying draw:
  Ervin Eleskovic
  Michael Lammer
  Miloslav Mečíř Jr.
  Alexander Ward

WTA singles main-draw entrants

Seeds

Other entrants
The following players received wildcards into the singles main draw:
  Lucy Brown 
  Katy Dunne
  Nicola George
  Jade Windley

The following players received entry from the qualifying draw:
  Naomi Broady
  Marta Domachowska
  Claire Feuerstein
  Anna-Lena Grönefeld
  Leticia Costas-Moreira
  Marta Sirotkina
  Melanie South
  Lara Arruabarrena-Vecino

The following players received entry as a lucky loser from the qualifying draw:
  Sarah Gronert

Champions

Men's singles

 Dmitry Tursunov def.  Andreas Beck, 6–4, 6–4

Women's singles

 Stefanie Vögele def.  Marta Domachowska, 6–7(3), 7–5, 6–2

Men's doubles

 Jamie Delgado /  Jonathan Marray def.  Yves Allegro / Andreas Beck, 6–3, 6–4

Women's doubles

 Tímea Babos /  Anne Kremer def.  Marta Domachowska /  Katarzyna Piter, 7–6(5), 6–2

External links
Official Website
ITF Search
ATP official site

Aegon GB Pro-Series Bath
Aegon GB Pro-Series Bath
Aegon GB Pro-Series Bath
Aegon GB Pro-Series Bath
2011 in English tennis